Voice of Jihad is the title of a website, which claims to be one of the official websites of the Islamic Emirate of Afghanistan (Taliban). It mainly provides latest news about Afghanistan in Arabic, Dari, English, Pashto, and Urdu.

Voice of Jihad is also the title of an online journal published by the Saudi branch of al-Qaeda between 2004 and 2007. An April 27, 2005, edition of Voice of Jihad included an article asking sympathizers not to appropriate the term "Voice of Jihad" for their own publications. An issue was published in February 2007 after a hiatus of almost two years.

See also 
Bakhtar News Agency
Mass media in Afghanistan

External links

References

Works by al-Qaeda
Islamic political websites
Magazines established in 2004
Magazines disestablished in 2007
Jihadist propaganda
Taliban
Afghan websites